Hydnellum tardum is a tooth fungus in the family Bankeraceae. Found in Europe, it was described as new to science in 1975 by Dutch mycologist Rudolph Arnold Maas Geesteranus, from collections made in coniferous forest in what was then known as West Germany.

References

External links

Fungi described in 1975
Fungi of Europe
Inedible fungi
tardum